= Middle Stack Mountain =

Mountain in Nevada, United States

Coordinates: 39°19′57″N 115°52′39″W

Middle Stack Mountain is a summit in the U.S. state of Nevada. The elevation is 8,041 feet (2,451 m).

Middle Stack Mountain was so named on account of its central location between two other nearby mountains. A variant name is "Middlestack Mountain".
